This was the eleventh European Championships and was won for the third time by France on points difference.

Results

Final standings

France wins the tournament on point differential.

References

European Nations Cup
European rugby league championship
European rugby league championship
International rugby league competitions hosted by the United Kingdom
International rugby league competitions hosted by France
1950 in French sport
1951 in French rugby league
1951 in Welsh sport
1950 in Welsh sport
1950 in rugby league